Kilbeacon is a civil parish in the ancient barony of Knocktopher. The parish contains 3,151 statute acres. According to Lewis's survey of 1837, "At Earlsrath was a large fort, encompassed by a fosse and a bank about 20 feet high.". In 1833, there were 383 inhabited houses in the parish; of these, 270 families were primarily engaged in agriculture, 61 in manufactures or crafts, 52 in other. The total population was 2284 people.

The main settlement in the parish is the village of Mullinavat which is located in parish's most southerly townland of the same name.

Geography
The Black Water, which is a tributary of the River Suir, flows through the parish from north to south. The highest point in the parish, at 200m, is in the eastern townland of Ballynooney East.

Ecclesiastical parish
Like all civil parishes, this civil parish is derived from, and co-extensive with a pre-existing Church of Ireland parish of the same name.). In the Diocese of Cashel and Ossory, the church mentioned in Lewis's survey is located in the townland of Garrandarragh. The building was in use from 1750 to 1900; today, only the tombstones of the adjoining graveyard are visible.

In the Catholic Church, the civil parish forms part of the ecclesiastical parish of Mullinavat in the Roman Catholic Diocese of Ossory. It also includes in its territory the area of the civil parishes of Killahy (between the rivers Black Water and Pollanassa); Rossin (on the southern side of Tory Hill); and the northern part of Dunkitt (also known as "Big Wood") in the neighbouring barony of Ida. Prior to 1842 this parish was united with Kilmacow.

Townlands
There are 11 townlands in the parish.

References
From :

Other sources

Civil parishes of County Kilkenny
Knocktopher